Patricky Freire (born January 21, 1986), known professionally by his ring name Patricky Pitbull, is a Brazilian mixed martial artist currently competing in Bellator's Lightweight division, where he is a former Bellator Lightweight World Champion. As of November 22, 2022, he is #1 in the Bellator Lightweight Rankings.

Mixed martial arts career

Bellator MMA
After competing in many Brazilian promotions, Freire compiled a 7–1 record before entering the Bellator Season Four Lightweight Tournament. He faced former WEC Lightweight Champion, Rob McCullough at Bellator 36 on March 12, 2011, in the opening round of the tournament. He won via TKO in the third round.

Freire went on to face two-time finalist Toby Imada in the semifinal at Bellator 39. Freire defeated Imada via knockout in the first round after landing a brutal flying knee and following up with a flurry of punches which caused Imada to fall to the mat unconscious. The win saw him progress to the final of the tournament where he faced fellow finalist Michael Chandler at Bellator 44. Freire lost via unanimous decision.

Freire next faced Kurt Pellegrino at Bellator 59 on November 26, 2011. He won the fight via TKO in the first round.

Freire faced Eddie Alvarez at Bellator 76. After a back-and-forth opening minute that saw both fighters rocked, he lost the fight via knockout in the first round.

It was announced that Freire will face Guillaume De Lorenzi in the Bellator 2013 Lightweight Tournament on January 31. Unfortunately, Freire suffered an injury and pulled out of the Lightweight Tournament a few days prior to this fight.

Freire returned to the Bellator cage on September 7, 2013, as he faced Derek Anderson at Bellator 98. Despite winning the first round, Freire lost the fight via unanimous decision.

In March 2014, Freire entered into the Bellator Season Ten Lightweight Tournament, where he faced David Rickels in the opening round at Bellator 113. He won the fight via knockout in the second round. In the semifinals, he faced Derek Campos at Bellator 117. Again he won the fight via TKO in the second round. He was scheduled to face Marcin Held in the finals at Bellator 120. However, Held was forced out of the bout due to injury, and the fight was subsequently cancelled. The bout eventually took place at Bellator 126 on September 26, 2014. Freire lost the fight via unanimous decision.

After nearly a year away from the sport, Freire returned to face Saad Awad at Bellator 141 on August 28, 2015. He won the fight by unanimous decision.

In the first rematch of his career, Freire faced Derek Anderson for a second time on December 4, 2015, at Bellator 147. He again lost the fight, this time by controversial split decision.

Freire replaced an injured Derek Anderson to face Ryan Couture at Bellator 148 on January 29, 2016. He won the bout via knockout in the first round.

It was announced that Freire will face Derek Campos for the second time as the Bellator 152 main event. Just four days before their scheduled bout Campos pulled out due to injury and replaced by the newly signed former UFC fighter Kevin Souza.

In May 2016, Bellator President Scott Coker announced that Freire would have a rematch against Michael Chandler at Bellator 157 on June 17, 2016.  The bout was for the vacant Bellator Lightweight Championship, which was vacated when champion Will Brooks was released from the promotion. Freire lost the fight via knockout in the first round.

Freire returned to the Bellator cage on February 18, 2017, in the main event at Bellator 172 against Josh Thomson. He won the fight via knockout in the second round.

Freire was expected to face Derek Campos for a second time at Bellator 167 on December 3, 2016, however Freire was forced out of the bout due to an injury. The rematch was scheduled to take place at Bellator 181 on July 14, 2017. However, Freire instead faced Benson Henderson at Bellator 183 on September 23, 2017. He won the fight by split decision. Freire is facing a 180-day medical suspension, unless he gets physician clearance regarding right rib pain.

Freire faced Derek Campos in a rematch at Bellator 194 on February 16, 2018. He won the fight via TKO in round one.

Freire faced Roger Huerta on September 21, 2018, at Bellator 205. He won the fight via knockout.

Bellator booked Freire against newcomer Ryan Scope for their first show in the Bellator Europe series that marked the start of the organization's partnership with Channel 5 and Sky Sports. The event was called Bellator Newcastle and took place on February 11. Despite rupturing a tendon in his right wrist on the first round of the fight, Freire won by split decision.

On February 20, 2019, Bellator announced that Freire had signed a multi-year, multi-fight contract extension with the organization.

Rizin FF
Due to his brother being the prevailing Bellator Lightweight champion, Patricky decided to take part in Rizin FF Lightweight tournament. In the first round of the tournament, Freire faced Tatsuya Kawajiri at Rizin 19 on October 12, 2019. He won the fight via knockout in the first round.

In the semifinals of the grand prix Freire faced Luiz Gustavo at Rizin 20 - Saitama on December 31, 2019. Freire won the fight via a first minute knockout and advanced to the grand prix final.

The 2019 Rizin Lightweight Grand Prix final was held in the same event with the semifinals. Despite Tofiq Musayev receiving a yellow card in the second round, Freire lost the fight via unanimous decision after being knocked down and largely dominated in every round.

Post-Rizin GP
In the first fight after the Rizin Lightweight Grand Prix, Freire was expected to headline Bellator Dublin 2 against Peter Queally on October 3, 2020. However, Queally was forced to withdraw from the bout due to a hand injury. Freire was subsequently rebooked to face Jaleel Willis two weeks later at Bellator 249 on October 15, 2020. In turn, this bout was cancelled the day of the event when the Mohegan Tribal Athletic Commission deemed Freire unable to compete due to what was termed an undisclosed medical issue.

Freire faced Peter Queally at Bellator 258 on May 7, 2021. After sustaining a cut on his forehead from an elbow while Queally was on the bottom, the doctor stopped the fight between rounds after the cutman was unable to stop the bleeding.

Bellator Lightweight World Champion 
Freire rematched Peter Queally at Bellator 270 on November 5, 2021. On October 6, 2021, Patricky's younger brother and Bellator MMA Lightweight Champion Patrício Pitbull announced he vacated the title and that the rematch with Queally would be for the Bellator Lightweight World Championship. Freire won the bout via second round technical knockout to become Bellator Lightweight World Champion.

Freire was scheduled to make the first defence of the Bellator Lightweight World Championship against Sidney Outlaw on July 22, 2022, at Bellator 283. On July 4, it was announced that Patricky had substained an injury and that the bout would be scrapped.

Freire then made his first defence, against Usman Nurmagomedov on November 18, 2022, at Bellator 288. He lost the fight and the belt via unanimous decision after a one-sided fight.

Lightweight Grand Prix 
On January 11, 2023, Freire was announced as one of the 8 participants in the $1 million Lightweight Grand Prix.

Championships and awards
Bellator MMA
Bellator Lightweight World Championship (One time)
Bellator Season Four Lightweight Tournament Runner-Up
Bellator Season Ten Lightweight Tournament Runner-Up
Tied (with Michael Page) for most knockout wins in Bellator history (10)
Most knockout wins in Bellator Lightweight division history (10)
Most fights in Bellator Lightweight division history (23)
Tied (with Michael Chandler) for the most wins in Bellator Lightweight division history (15)
Tied (with Michael Chandler) for the most stoppage wins in Bellator Lightweight division history (10)
MMAJunkie
January 2016 Knockout of the Month vs. Ryan Couture on January 29
Rizin Fighting Federation
2019 Rizin Lightweight Grand Prix Runner-Up

Mixed martial arts record

|-
|Loss
|align=center|24–11
|Usman Nurmagomedov
|Decision (unanimous)
|Bellator 288
|
|align=center|5
|align=center|5:00
|Chicago, Illinois, United States
|
|-
|Win
|align=center|24–10
|Peter Queally
|TKO (punches)
|Bellator 270
|
|align=center|2
|align=center|1:05
|Dublin, Ireland
|
|-
|Loss
|align=center| 23–10
|Peter Queally
|TKO (doctor stoppage)
|Bellator 258
|
|align=center|2
|align=center|5:00
|Uncasville, Connecticut, United States
|
|-
|Loss
|align=center|23–9
|Tofiq Musayev
|Decision (unanimous)
|rowspan=2 |Rizin 20
|rowspan=2 |
|align=center|3
|align=center|5:00
|rowspan=2 |Saitama, Japan
|
|-
|Win
|align=center| 23–8
|Luiz Gustavo
|KO (punches and soccer kick) 
|align=center|1
|align=center|0:28
|
|-
|Win
|align=center| 22–8
|Tatsuya Kawajiri
|KO (flying knee and punches)
|Rizin 19
|
|align=center|1
|align=center|1:10
|Osaka, Japan 
|
|-
|Win
|align=center| 21–8
|Ryan Scope
|Decision (split)
|Bellator Newcastle
|
|align=center|3
|align=center|5:00
|Newcastle upon Tyne, England
|
|-
| Win
| align=center| 20–8
|Roger Huerta
|KO (punch)
|Bellator 205
|
|align=center|2
|align=center|0:43
|Boise, Idaho, United States
|
|-
| Win
| align=center| 19–8
|Derek Campos
|TKO (punches)
|Bellator 194
|
|align=center|1
|align=center|2:23
|Uncasville, Connecticut, United States
|
|-
| Win
| align=center| 18–8
|Benson Henderson
|Decision (split)
|Bellator 183
|
|align=center|3
|align=center|5:00
|San Jose, California, United States
|
|-
| Win
| align=center| 17–8
| Josh Thomson
| KO (punch)
| Bellator 172
| 
| align=center|2
| align=center|0:40
| San Jose, California, United States 
|
|-
| Loss
| align=center|16–8
| Michael Chandler
|KO (punch)
| Bellator 157: Dynamite 2
| 
| align=center|1
| align=center|2:14
| St. Louis, Missouri, United States
|
|-
| Win
| align=center|16–7
| Kevin Souza
|Decision (unanimous)
| Bellator 152
| 
| align=center|3
| align=center|5:00
| Torino, Italy
|
|-
| Win
| align=center|15–7
| Ryan Couture
| KO (punch)
| Bellator 148
| 
| align=center| 1
| align=center| 3:00
| Fresno, California, United States
|
|-
| Loss
| align=center|14–7
| Derek Anderson
| Decision (split)
| Bellator 147
| 
| align=center| 3
| align=center| 5:00
| San Jose, California, United States
|
|-
| Win
| align=center|14–6
| Saad Awad
| Decision (unanimous)
| Bellator 141
| 
| align=center| 3
| align=center| 5:00
| Temecula, California, United States
|
|-
|Loss
|align=center|13–6
|Marcin Held
|Decision (unanimous)
|Bellator 126
|
|align=center|3
|align=center|5:00
|Phoenix, Arizona, United States
|
|-
|Win
|align=center|13–5
|Derek Campos
|TKO (punches)
|Bellator 117
|
|align=center|2
|align=center| 0:52
|Council Bluffs, Iowa, United States
|
|-
|Win
|align=center|12–5
|David Rickels
|KO (punches)
|Bellator 113
|
|align=center|2
|align=center|0:54
|Mulvane, Kansas, United States
|
|-
|Win
|align=center|11–5
|Edson Berto
|Decision (unanimous)
|Bellator 107
|
|align=center| 3
|align=center| 5:00
|Thackerville, Oklahoma, United States
|
|-
|Loss
|align=center| 10–5
|Derek Anderson
|Decision (unanimous)
|Bellator 98
|
|align=center|3
|align=center|5:00
|Uncasville, Connecticut, United States
|
|-
|Loss
|align=center| 10–4
|Eddie Alvarez
|KO (head kick and punches)
|Bellator 76
|
|align=center|1
|align=center|4:54
|Windsor, Ontario, Canada
|
|-
|Loss
|align=center| 10–3
|Lloyd Woodard
|Submission (kimura)
|Bellator 62
|
|align=center|2
|align=center|1:46
|Laredo, Texas, United States
|
|-
|Win
|align=center| 10–2
|Kurt Pellegrino
|TKO (punches)
|Bellator 59
|
|align=center|1
|align=center|0:50
|Atlantic City, New Jersey, United States
|
|-
|Loss
|align=center| 9–2
|Michael Chandler
|Decision (unanimous)
|Bellator 44
|
|align=center| 3
|align=center| 5:00
|Atlantic City, New Jersey, United States
| 
|-
|Win
|align=center| 9–1
|Toby Imada
|KO (flying knee and punches)
|Bellator 39
|
|align=center| 1
|align=center| 2:53
|Uncasville, Connecticut, United States
|
|-
|Win
|align=center| 8–1
|Rob McCullough
|TKO (punches)
|Bellator 36
|
|align=center| 3
|align=center| 3:11
|Shreveport, Louisiana, United States
|
|-
|Win
|align=center| 7–1
|Yure Machado
|Decision (unanimous)
|Arena Gold Fights 2
|
|align=center| 3
|align=center| 5:00
|Curitiba, Brazil
| 
|-
|Win
|align=center| 6–1
|Marlon Medeiros
|TKO (flying knee and punches)
|Platinum Fight Brazil 3
|
|align=center| 2
|align=center| N/A
|São Paulo, Brazil
| 
|-
|Win
|align=center| 5–1
|Emerson Queiroz
|Submission (guillotine choke)
|Gouveia Fight Championship
|
|align=center| 2
|align=center| N/A
|Natal, Rio Grande do Norte, Brazil
| 
|-
|Loss
|align=center| 4–1
|Willamy Freire
|Technical Decision (unanimous)
|Rino's FC 4
|
|align=center| 3
|align=center| 1:45
|Fortaleza, Brazil
| 
|-
|Win
|align=center| 4–0
|Maykon Costa
|Decision (unanimous)
|Leal Combat: Natal
|
|align=center| 3
|align=center| 5:00
|Natal, Rio Grande do Norte, Brazil
| 
|-
|Win
|align=center| 3–0
|Joao Paulo Rodrigues 
|KO (stomps)
|Cage Fight Nordeste
|
|align=center| 1
|align=center| 0:50
|Natal, Rio Grande do Norte, Brazil
| 
|-
|Win
|align=center| 2–0
|Gleidson Alves Martins 
|KO (punches)
|Fight Ship Looking Boy 2
|
|align=center| 3
|align=center| N/A
|Natal, Rio Grande do Norte, Brazil
| 
|-
|Win
|align=center| 1–0
|Arquimedes Vieira
|KO (stomps)
|Fight Ship Looking Boy 1
|
|align=center| 1
|align=center| N/A
|Natal, Rio Grande do Norte, Brazil
|

See also
 List of current Bellator fighters

References

External links
 
 

1986 births
Living people
Brazilian male mixed martial artists
American male mixed martial artists
Lightweight mixed martial artists
Mixed martial artists utilizing Muay Thai
Mixed martial artists utilizing Brazilian jiu-jitsu
Bellator male fighters
Brazilian Muay Thai practitioners
Brazilian practitioners of Brazilian jiu-jitsu
People awarded a black belt in Brazilian jiu-jitsu
People from Mossoró
Sportspeople from Rio Grande do Norte